Paul McDonald Robinett (1893–1975) was a cavalry and armor officer (Brigadier General) of the U.S. Army.  He spent much of his career as a staff officer, and commanded an armored regiment and combined arms combat command in combat during the Tunisian campaign of World War II.

Biography
Robinett hailed from Missouri's Ozark foothills, scion of Ozark pioneers. After high school, he worked a summer in the Kansas harvest fields before enrolling in the University of Missouri, where he completed his B.S. (1917) in Agriculture.  Since the U.S. had entered World War I, he tried to enlist but was rejected as underweight.  After beginning a graduate fellowship at Iowa State, he again tried to enlist, unsuccessfully.

But he was accepted for officer training, subsequently commissioned a 2nd lieutenant in the 1st Cavalry.  During World War I, First Cavalry served along the border with Mexico; during this time, he was promoted to first lieutenant.
He was graduated from the Cavalry School Troop Commander's course at Fort Riley, Kansas in 1922, and taught Machine Gunnery
and animal transportation there 1922–1923. He was a special student at the University of Paris in 1925, attended the French cavalry school at Saumur, and observed French maneuvers near Strasbourg. He was General Malin Craig's aide-de-camp 1927–1932, serving in the Panama Canal Zone and San Francisco.  
Captain Paul McD. Robinett, Cavalry, completed the United States Army Command and General Staff College's two-year course and graduated June 15, 1934.
He attended the U.S. Army War College. He served in the War Department's General Staff 1937–1941. He was Assistant Chief of Staff for intelligence under both Lesley J. McNair (from June 26, 1941) and George C. Marshall.  President F. D. Roosevelt nominated him for promotion to colonel on November 20, 1942.

His personal credo was:  "Always do whatever you can to keep your superior from making a mistake."  He was a crack shot with a pistol and expert rider.  Only one soldier of the 3rd Infantry ever collected on his offer of a dollar to any soldier who could out shoot him.  He was an accomplished horseman, a member of the U.S. Army equestrian team, and competed in the 1924 Summer Olympics in Paris.

During the Tunisian campaign of World War II he commanded the 13th Armored Regiment,  "Task Force Green," and 1st Armored Division's Combat Command B.   After the American defeat at the battle of Kasserine Pass, his CCB and 1st Infantry Division repulsed a German advance west on Highway 13 toward Tebessa.

General Robinett and CCB were to lead 1st Armored Division's assault from Mateur toward Bizerte at first light on Thursday morning, May 6, 1943.  The day before, as Robinett was returning to CCB, the confidence of the new division commander General Harmon in Robinett diminished so much he determined to relieve him.  Harmon raced after Robinett to relieve him.  He caught up just after a German artillery shell had shredded Robinett's left leg.  General Robinett's war was over; he had already ceded command to Colonel Clarence C. Benson.

He commanded the Armored School at Fort Knox, Kentucky until he retired at the end of the war.

The 1940 census listed him as a resident of the Kennedy-Warren Apartment Building in Washington, D.C. and later the Army Navy Club, Washington, D.C. In 1941, then Lt Col Robinett was an honorary pallbearer at the funeral of General Craig's wife.

Brigadier General Robinett was a Missouri delegate at the 1948 Republican National Convention, and served on the resolution committee's foreign affairs subcommittee.

After the Korean War, BGen Robinett complained that American military succumbed to a "natural tendency" to develop quickly capabilities to counter an enemy, rather than those to defeat and destroy him.  U.S. defense developed equipment and tactics weighted too much on defensive implements.  In particular, the tanks were to be used chiefly to support infantry and an insufficient number of armored divisions – more mobile and more offensive.  He recalled the blitzkrieg of World War II and the North Korea's tank invasion of the South.

Decorations

Dates of rank

Publications
 3,000 items. – 10 containers. – 4 linear 
 
 
 
 1 sound disc : analog, 33 1/3 rpm ; 16 in. (preservation master)

 
  

 3,000 items. – 10 containers. – 4 linear feet.

References

Bibliography

 (Reprinted from the ADA Magazine)

External links
Generals of World War II

United States Army generals
People from Mountain Grove, Missouri
1893 births
1975 deaths
Place of death missing
Olympic equestrians of the United States
American male equestrians
Equestrians at the 1924 Summer Olympics
University of Missouri alumni
Recipients of the Legion of Merit
Recipients of the Distinguished Service Medal (US Army)
Recipients of the Legion of Honour
Recipients of the Croix de Guerre (France)
Missouri Republicans
United States Army generals of World War II
United States Army personnel of World War I
United States Army Command and General Staff College alumni
United States Army War College alumni